Carlo Gritti Morlacchi (1777–1852) was the Bishop of Bergamo from 1831 to 1852.

Life

Born in Alzano Lombardo, at the time a territory of Republic of Venice.

He studied in various seminaries in Lombardy and was ordained priest in 1801. Gritti Morlacchi was then named by Bishop Giampaolo Dolfin as headmaster of the Seminary of Bergamo. Later he was canon of the cathedral and was then named pastor of the Parish of Sant' Alessandro in Colonna in Bergamo.

After the death of Bishop Pietro Mola, Morlacchi was named Bishop of Bergamo by Pope Pius VIII.

Episcopacy

Consacreted bishop by Cardinal Carlo Odescalchi on 6 March 1831, he assumed the duty of a bishop. During his episcopacy, the entire territory of his diocese was part of the Kingdom of Lombardy–Venetia and he defended many times the autonomy of the Church against the Austrian authorities. Bishop Morlacchi appointed as teachers at the seminary many priests considered close to the ideas of Cornelius Otto Jansen.

During the turmoil of 1848 he supported the idea of a unified Italy under Carlo Alberto. the king of Sardinia.

He died in 1852.

See also
 Morlacchi

References

External links and additional sources
 (for Chronology of Bishops) 
 (for Chronology of Bishops) 

1777 births
1852 deaths
People from Alzano Lombardo
Bishops of Bergamo
19th-century Italian Roman Catholic bishops